Steinhagen may refer to the following municipalities in Germany:

Steinhagen, North Rhine-Westphalia, in the district of Gütersloh, North Rhine-Westphalia
Steinhagen, Rostock, in the district of Rostock, Mecklenburg-Vorpommern
Steinhagen, Vorpommern-Rügen, in the district Vorpommern-Rügen, Mecklenburg-Vorpommern

Steinhagen may also refer to the following:

Steinhagen (street), street in the municipality of Strand, Norway